The Yom Kippur balls were countercultural, antireligious festivities held by Jewish anarchists and socialists on Yom Kippur, the holiest day of the Jewish year and day of atonement. Revelers sang, danced, ate, and heard speeches from famous anarchists. The tradition began in England in 1888 and, under the Pioneers of Liberty, recurred annually from New York the year after. By 1891, six other American cities held their own balls.

History 

In the late 1880s, anarchism was the largest movement among Jewish–American radicals. Alongside government and capitalism, this counterculture took aim at religion as incompatible with their principles of reason and science, though they retained their secular Yiddish culture. Among the radicals' provocations was the Yom Kippur ball, a joyous event sacrilegiously held during the somber Jewish day of atonement. The provocation stirred the ire of the Orthodox community, who saw the act as directly offensive to their faith.

The tradition began in 1888 with British Jewish anarchists in Whitechapel under Benjamin Feigenbaum, but became a significant annual tradition in New York under the Pioneers of Liberty. On the occasion of the first ball, held in 1889, more conservative elements of the Jewish community persuaded the hall owner to break its contract with the anarchists. The ball moved to the Fourth Street Labor Lyceum. The festivities included singing, dancing, readings in Yiddish, Russian, and German, and orations from Johann Most, Saul Yanovsky, and Roman Lewis.

The balls continued annually in New York and spread to other American cities: by 1891, Baltimore, Boston, Chicago, Philadelphia, Providence, and St. Louis. Festivities in New York included music, dancing, buffet, and "La Marseillaise". In 1890, Most delivered the Kol Nidre, and in 1891, Hillel Solotaroff and Lewis spoke. In New England, Moshe Katz gave a Kol Nidre sermon on religion's evolution, and in Philadelphia, a police raid on the event led to two arrests for incitation to riot.

Historian of anarchism Paul Avrich concluded that the balls were "counterproductive", estranging both devout Jews and those who viewed the festivities as a caustic attack on their traditions.  Insurrectionary zeal declined over the next decade, and by the turn of the 20th century, Jewish anarchists had adopted a more pragmatic, piecemeal approach towards change. This included a détente towards antireligious confrontation, which had been a hallmark of the initial movement. In effect, Yom Kippur balls continued but fewer in number and not as flagrantly wielded. The Kishinev and other Russian pogroms from 1903 to 1906  sobered some Jewish anarchists from radicalism and towards Zionism.

References

Bibliography 

 
 
 
 

Anarchism in New York (state)
Annual events in New York City
Jewish anarchism
Jewish atheism
Jewish socialism
Jews and Judaism in Baltimore
Jews and Judaism in Boston
Jews and Judaism in Chicago
Jews and Judaism in London
Jews and Judaism in Montreal
Jews and Judaism in New York City
Jews and Judaism in Philadelphia
Jews and Judaism in Rhode Island
Jews and Judaism in St. Louis
Secular Jewish culture in Canada
Secular Jewish culture in the United Kingdom
Secular Jewish culture in the United States
Socialism in the United States
Yom Kippur
Anti-Orthodox Judaism sentiment